Yurécuaro is a town and a municipality in the region of the Chapala cienega at the north-west in the Mexican state of Michoacán, at a height of 1530 meters (5065 ft) above sea level.  Its limits to the north with the state of Jalisco separated by the Lerma river, at west with La Piedad, at south with Ecuandureo and to the southeast with Tanhuato. The distance to the state capital Morelia is 125 miles and to Guadalajara is 85 miles.

Etymology
Yurécuaro comes from the Purepecha iorekuarhu meaning "riverside" or "place of growing".

History
The city was founded May 22, 1559 by Viceroy Don Luis de Velasco.

Transportation
Transport routes in Yurécuaro include:
Road state 110 east to La Piedad west La Barca
Road Yurecuaro-La Concepcion, Jalisco
Zamora-Yurecuaro toll expressway (under planning)
Train Mexico-Guadalajara and Yurecuaro-Zamora

Municipalities of Michoacán